Sandra Dickinson (née Searles) is an American-British actress. She trained at the Central School of Speech and Drama in London. She has often played characters within the trope of a dumb blonde with a high-pitched voice.

Early life
Dickinson was born in Washington, D.C. and grew up in Maryland with her younger brother. Her father, Harold F. Searles, was a psychoanalyst. Her mother, Sulvii "Sylvia" Manninen, of Finnish descent, was a nurse.

Career

She made her acting debut as a waitress in the 1973 British film The Final Programme. She is perhaps most well-known for her role of Trillian in the  TV series  of Douglas Adams's The Hitchhiker's Guide to the Galaxy.

She has appeared in films including Superman III,  Supergirl, StagKnight, Ready Player One and The Batman.

She has provided the American voice of Jemima Puddle-Duck in the British animated children's television series The World of Peter Rabbit and Friends, the Voice Trumpets in the US dub of Teletubbies, Bitchin' Betty in the 1996 film Space Truckers, and Chico in Counterfeit Cat.

She has made guest appearances on shows, such as Philip Marlowe, Private Eye, Casualty, New Tricks, Holby City, Uncle, Doctors and White Van Man.

Personal life
Dickinson married actor Peter Davison on December 26, 1978, and they were divorced in 1994. Together they composed and performed the theme tune to the 1980s children's programme Button Moon. They have a daughter, Georgia Tennant, who is also an actress.

Dickinson married her third husband, another British actor and singer, Mark Osmond, on August 16, 2009. The wedding was filmed for Four Weddings, a reality TV show where four couples compete to have theirs voted the best wedding; hers came third. Osmond is the lead singer of the band Bigger Than Mary, who played at the wedding. Her grandson gave her away. The wedding took place in Shepperton, where the couple lived at the time. 

Dickinson became a British citizen the same year. With her husband, she runs the Shepperton-based stage school Close Up Theatre School.

She was also an occasional guest panellist on the BBC quiz show Blankety Blank in the early 1980s.

Filmography

TV

Film

Her film and TV roles include:
 Birds Eye Beefburger TV advertisements, directed by Alan Parker, in the early 1970s. 
 Emily in A Man for Emily in The Tomorrow People (1975). Her future husband Peter Davison played her on-screen brother.
 Trillian in the 1981 television adaptation of The Hitchhiker's Guide to the Galaxy. Sandra Dickinson said in an interview in The Making of The Hitch Hiker's Guide to the Galaxy that when she heard that she had been suggested for the role of Trillian, she thought it completely mad – Sandra Dickinson was blonde and fair-skinned, and in the Hitch Hiker book, Trillian is described as dark and looking "slightly Arabic". However, during the screen test, Douglas Adams was sufficiently impressed with her acting skills that when Dickinson suggested wryly, "I've got to get my Union Jack lenses in" (i.e., practice my English accent), Douglas Adams asked her to use her natural voice and accent. Dickinson later returned to the "Hitchhiker's" universe to play Tricia MacMillan in the fourth and fifth radio series produced by Above the Title for BBC Radio 4.
 A parallel universe version of Trillian (AKA Tricia McMillan) in the Quintessential Phase of the Hitch-Hiker's Guide radio series.
 Zelda in Cover, a 1981 drama series from Thames Television, set in a recruitment and testing agency for the spy service.
 Cameo appearance in the film Superman III (1983) as the wife of a man who puts a grapefruit in her face after seeing the size of a bill from Bloomingdale's. A year later, Dickinson made an appearance as a party guest in Supergirl.
 The role of Nancy Day in The Lonely Lady (1983), adapted from the Harold Robbins novel.
 A cameo as celebrity actress Marilyn Gale in the 1986 Hercule Poirot TV film Dead Man's Folly.
 A guest appearance on one episode of the CITV pre-school series Rainbow.
 Sally, a receptionist at a bloodbank, in a 1991 episode of HBO's Tales from the Crypt series.
 Tina in the 1990s sitcom 2point4 children.
 Jemima Puddle-Duck in the American dubbed version of The World of Peter Rabbit and Friends.
Voiced Tog on Squeak!
 Additional voices in the Universal and Amblin Entertainment animated feature film We're Back! A Dinosaur's Story.
 Maggie in the 1996 Doctor Who BBC radio serial The Ghosts of N-Space.
 Sylvie, Dixie and Rosy's mother in the Universal and Amblin Entertainment animated feature film Balto.
 The voice of Bitchin' Betty, the truck's computer, in the 1996 comedy film Space Truckers.
 The US Voice Trumpets, in the PBS version of the original Teletubbies.
 Debbie Hall, a tourist who arrives in Holby City Hospital with her husband, who has been stabbed by a mugger, in a 2001 episode of the BBC1 drama Casualty.
 Fay, the demonic owner of a paintball park, in the 2007 horror comedy film StagKnight.
 Lady Gloria Gransford in a 2009 episode of the BBC drama New Tricks.
 Miss Swanson in the 2009 British slasher film Tormented.
 Mother in the 2009 British fantasy film Malice in Wonderland.
 The voice of Grandma Tracy in the 2015 TV series Thunderbirds Are Go
 The three evil bounty hunters Chico, Zaxos and Flargle in the British-Canadian Disney XD animated series Counterfeit Cat.
 Dory, the housekeeper of Bruce Wayne, in the 2022 film The Batman.

She also revoiced some of the female voice trumpets (as well as the narrator saying "1, 2, 3, 4, Teletubbies!" line at the start of the opening titles) in Teletubbies for the American market.

Other acting roles
Dickinson and then husband Peter Davison appeared together in Doctor Who producer John Nathan-Turner's production of the holiday pantomime Cinderella in 1983. They also appeared in a stage production of The Owl and the Pussycat, and Barefoot in the Park, a London stage production from 1984, as a pair of American newlyweds adjusting to life in their new high-rise apartment.

In 1997, she played Eunice Hubbel in Peter Hall's production of A Streetcar Named Desire at Theatre Royal, Haymarket.

She played Queen Camilla in a Carlisle pantomime production of Snow White & the Seven Dwarves in 2007, and the following year played the Fairy Godmother at the Towngate Theatre, Basildon's production of Cinderella, reprising the role in the 2009 Harlow Playhouse theatre production of Cinderella alongside her now-husband, Mark Osmond. From 18 December 2010 to 9 January 2011, Dickinson played the evil Queen Maleficent in the pantomime Snow White and the Seven Dwarfs at the Corn Exchange in Exeter. From 13 December 2014 to 4 January 2015, Dickinson played Queen Whoppa in the pantomime Jack and the Beanstalk at Exeter Corn Exchange.

She played Debbie in White Van Man series 1, episode 5 "Honest", first broadcast on 12 April 2011. The series stars her daughter Georgia Tennant. She provides many voices including those of Granny Jojo, Mrs. Jotunheim, Felicity Parham, and the cupcake woman from The Amazing World of Gumball and is the voice of Grandma Tracey in the 2015 Thunderbirds revival.

In 2014, she understudied Angela Lansbury in the West End production of Blithe Spirit – co-starring Simon Jones, with whom she had worked on The Hitchhiker's Guide to the Galaxy – but she never got to perform Madame Arcati, other than in the public understudy run, as Lansbury did not miss a single performance.

References

External links

Sandra Dickinson at the British Film Institute
BBC interview with Sandra Dickinson

Living people
20th-century American actresses
21st-century American actresses
20th-century British actresses
21st-century British actresses
Actresses from Washington, D.C.
Alumni of the Royal Central School of Speech and Drama
American emigrants to England
American expatriate actresses in the United Kingdom
American film actresses
American stage actresses
American people of Finnish descent
American television actresses
American voice actresses
British film actresses
British television actresses
British people of Finnish descent
British voice actresses
Year of birth missing (living people)